Albatros was the fourth of six Type 23 torpedo boats built for the German Navy (initially called the Reichsmarine and renamed the Kriegsmarine in 1935). Completed in 1927, Albatros often served as a flagship of torpedo boat units. The ship made multiple non-intervention patrols during the Spanish Civil War in the late 1930s. After an attack by aircraft of the Spanish Republican Air Force killed German sailors in 1937, she participated in the retaliatory bombardment of Almería.

At the beginning of World War II in 1939, Albatros helped to lay minefields and made anti-shipping patrols before participating in Operation Weserübung, the German invasion of Norway in April 1940. The ship fired the first shots of the campaign when she encountered and crippled a Norwegian patrol boat. She was lightly damaged during the Battle of Horten Harbor. Albatros then ran aground and was wrecked.

Design and armament

Derived from the World War I-era torpedo boat , the Type 23 torpedo boat was slightly larger, but had a similar armament and speed. Their crew consisted of 4 officers and 116 sailors.

As built, the Type 23s mounted three  SK L/45 guns, one forward and two aft of the superstructure; the aft superfiring gun was on an open mount while the others were protected by gun shields. They carried six rotating  torpedo tubes in two triple mounts amidships and could also carry up to 30 mines. After 1931, the torpedo tubes were replaced by  tubes and a pair of  C/30 antiaircraft guns were added. At least some of the ships were fitted with depth charges, but details are lacking.

Construction and career
The half-flotilla was under the command of Korvettenkapitän Karl Dönitz, who later became grand admiral of the Kriegsmarine of Nazi Germany.

In the spring of 1929, Albatros was departing Wilhelmshaven to take part in a fleet cruise in Spanish waters, and collided with Möwe at the exit from the harbor. Both ships followed the fleet four days later after repairs. In 1931, the 4th Torpedo Boat Half-Flotilla and the light cruiser  were present during the celebrations of the 10th anniversary of the Latvian Navy in Libau. The following year, Albatros, again with her sisters and Königsberg, represented Germany at the celebration of the betrothal of Prince Gustaf Adolf, Duke of Västerbotten of Sweden, the oldest son of the then crown prince of Sweden, to the German princess Sibylla of Saxe-Coburg and Gotha. On 7 December 1932, Albatros was decommissioned and replaced by Greif as flagship of the 4th Half-Flotilla.

On 5 October 1933, Albatros, commanded by Kapitänleutnant (Lieutenant) Werner Hartmann, was put back into service, replacing the pre-war boat T151 in the 2nd Torpedo Boat Half-Flotilla based at Swinemünde (now Świnoujście, Poland).

Spanish Civil War

From July 1936 to October 1937, Albatros carried out three non-intervention patrols in Spanish waters which were intended to prevent men and material from reaching the participants of the Spanish Civil War. The warships not only transported refugees, but also escorted the many merchant ships that were chartered by Germany for the repatriation of their citizens. The half-flotilla returned to Spain with Albatros from 28 September to 29 November. Her sister  ran aground while leaving Cadiz harbor that same month and had to return to Germany on one turbine, escorted by Albatros.

The 2nd Half-Flotilla returned to Spain for the third time from May to June 1937. On 24 May, Republican aircraft attacked the town and harbor of Palma de Mallorca causing Deutschland to depart for Ibiza, although Albatross captain chose to remain in port. During subsequent attacks later that day, several bombs fell near the ship and she steamed to join the cruiser in Ibiza. Five days later, another attack was carried out on Deutschland which killed several dozen crewmen. As retaliation, Adolf Hitler ordered Admiral Scheer to bombard the Republican-held city of Almería. The four boats of the 2nd Half-Flotilla escorted the ship as she did so on 31 May, targeting Republican coastal artillery, naval buildings and ships in the harbor, which killed 19 people.

Interwar
In fall 1937, the 2nd Half-Flotilla was disbanded, and Albatros served as a training ship until she was decommissioned on 16 February 1938. The boat was placed back into service on 1 July 1938 and was assigned to the 6th Torpedo Boat Flotilla. She was transferred four months later to the 5th Torpedo Boat Flotilla, which included her sisters Greif, Möwe, and Falke.

Second World War

At the start of World War II, Albatros was used in the defensive mining operations in the North Sea that began on 3 September 1939 that were intended to prevent the British Royal Navy from entering the German Bight. From 3 to 5 October Albatros, together with three destroyers and her sisters Greif and Falke, was tasked with anti-shipping patrols in the Kattegat and Skaggerak that captured four ships.

During Operation Weserübung, Albatros was assigned to Group 5 under Konteradmiral Oskar Kummetz on the heavy cruiser , tasked to capture Oslo. Albatros transported about 100 men of the invasion force and was one of the cruiser's escorts through the Baltic and Kattegat. While passing Skagen, Denmark, on 8 April 1940, the British submarine  unsuccessfully attacked the cruisers of the group with torpedoes. Albatros spotted their tracks and unsuccessfully depth charged the submarine. Later that night the group encountered the Norwegian patrol boat  in heavy fog at 23:00. After firing a warning shot and realizing that Albatros would not turn away, and was going to violate Norwegian neutrality, Pol III fired flares to alert Norwegian coastal batteries and rammed Albatros in the side. From Albatros it was clear that the guns on Pol III were manned, and that the Norwegians intended to fight. Despite clear orders from Kummetz to fire only if fired upon, the torpedo boat's captain, Kapitänleutnant Siegfried Strelow, opened fire, hitting Pol III with at least two 10.5 cm shells and raking her with machine guns, thus firing the opening shots of the campaign. The Norwegian ship's crew attempted to abandon ship in the only intact boat remaining, but it capsized and they were taken aboard Albatros. Albatross crew set the patrol boat on fire and abandoned it, proceeding up the foggy Oslofjord independently. The torpedo boat was finally able to get a bearing from her sister Kondor and followed her towards the naval base at Karljohansvern, in the town of Horten. En route, she was spotted by the lightly armed Norwegian minesweeper  which sheered off after radioing a report at 04:03 on 9 April.

The German force tasked to occupy Karljohansvern was scheduled to do so at dawn on 9 April, but Kondors captain, the commander of the force, decided to assault the harbor directly since the Norwegians had already been alerted. About 140 soldiers were transferred to the small motor minesweepers R17 and R21 and the former was in the lead as they steamed through the harbor entrance at 04:35 at high speed, slowly followed by Albatros, while Kondor was transferring her embarked troops to another ship. The minelayer  engaged R17 ten minutes later and set her on fire, but not before she unloaded her troops. The minelayer was only able to get a few shots off at R21 before she steamed behind an island in the harbor. About this time, Albatros was approaching the harbor mouth and exchanged fire with Olav Tryggvason without effect. Strelow, with only a single gun able to bear on the minelayer, withdrew behind one of the outer islands and started blindly bombarding the harbor. The minelayer was occasionally struck by shrapnel, but she hit the torpedo boat with one shell at 06:30, killing two and wounding another pair of sailors. Albatros withdrew not long afterward  and the German troops that had made it ashore bluffed the Norwegians into surrendering at 07:35.

Later that morning, Kondor and Albatros were ordered to land their troops at Son and then, reinforced by R21, she was ordered to secure the submarine base at Teie. On the morning of 10 April, Kondor and Albatros were engaged by coastal batteries on the island of Bolærne and forced to turn away. Later that day, Albatros was escorting the merchant ship  while also landing men on the island of Rauøy; Strelow decided to steam east of the island to avoid any further attention from the guns on Bolærne. The impact ripped open at least one fuel tank and holed the turbine and boiler rooms. The ship settled with a pronounced list to port and her stern in the air. She quickly lost all electrical power and several fires were ignited that caused several small explosions; Albatros was declared a total loss. The crew were rescued by the Vorpostenboot  and was later assigned to  after the Norwegian surrender. The minelayer was initially renamed Albatros II and then became Brummer.

Notes

Citations

Bibliography
 
 

 
 
 
 
 

 

Type 23 torpedo boats
1926 ships
Ships built in Wilhelmshaven
Military units and formations of Nazi Germany in the Spanish Civil War
Maritime incidents in April 1940